Emily Jane Brontë (commonly ; 30 July 1818 – 19 December 1848) was an English novelist and poet who is best known for her only novel, Wuthering Heights, now considered a classic of English literature. She also published a book of poetry with her sisters Charlotte and Anne titled Poems by Currer, Ellis and Acton Bell with her own poems finding regard as poetic genius. Emily was the second-youngest of the four surviving Brontë siblings, between the youngest Anne and her brother Branwell. She published under the pen name Ellis Bell.

Early life

Emily Brontë was born on 30 July 1818 to Maria Branwell and an Irish father, Patrick Brontë. The family was living on Market Street in the village of Thornton on the outskirts of Bradford, in the West Riding of Yorkshire, England.  Emily was the second youngest of six siblings, preceded by Maria, Elizabeth, Charlotte and Branwell.  In 1820, Emily's younger sister Anne, the last Brontë child, was born. Shortly thereafter, the family moved eight miles away to Haworth, where Patrick was employed as perpetual curate.  In Haworth, the children would have opportunities to develop their literary talents.

When Emily was only three, and all six children under the age of eight, she and her siblings lost their mother, Maria, to cancer on 15 September 1821. The younger children were to be cared for by Elizabeth Branwell, their aunt and Maria's sister.

Emily's three elder sisters, Maria, Elizabeth, and Charlotte, were sent to the Clergy Daughters' School at Cowan Bridge. At the age of six, on 25 November 1824, Emily joined her sisters at school for a brief period. At school, however, the children suffered abuse and privations, and when a typhoid epidemic swept the school, Maria and Elizabeth became ill. Maria, who may actually have had tuberculosis, was sent home, where she died. Elizabeth died shortly after.

The four youngest Brontë children, all under ten years of age, had suffered the loss of the three eldest women in their immediate family.

Charlotte maintained that the school's poor conditions permanently affected her health and physical development and that it had hastened the deaths of Maria (born 1814) and Elizabeth (born 1815), who both died in 1825. After the deaths of his older daughters, Patrick removed Charlotte and Emily from the school. Charlotte would use her experiences and knowledge of the school as the basis for Lowood School in Jane Eyre.

The three remaining sisters and their brother Branwell were thereafter educated at home by their father and aunt Elizabeth Branwell. A shy girl, Emily was very close to her siblings and was known as a great animal lover, especially for befriending stray dogs she found wandering around the countryside. Despite the lack of formal education, Emily and her siblings had access to a wide range of published material; favourites included Sir Walter Scott, Byron, Shelley, and Blackwood's Magazine.

Inspired by a box of toy soldiers Branwell had received as a gift, the children began to write stories, which they set in a number of invented imaginary worlds populated by their soldiers as well as their heroes, the Duke of Wellington and his sons, Charles and Arthur Wellesley. Little of Emily's work from this period survives, except for poems spoken by characters. Initially, all four children shared in creating stories about a world called Angria.

However, when Emily was 13, she and Anne withdrew from participation in the Angria story and began a new one about Gondal, a fictional island whose myths and legends were to preoccupy the two sisters throughout their lives. With the exception of their Gondal poems and Anne's lists of Gondal's characters and place-names, Emily and Anne's Gondal writings were largely not preserved. Among those that did survive are some "diary papers," written by Emily in her twenties, which describe current events in Gondal. The heroes of Gondal tended to resemble the popular image of the Scottish Highlander, a sort of British version of the "noble savage": romantic outlaws capable of more nobility, passion, and bravery than the denizens of "civilization". Similar themes of romanticism and noble savagery are apparent across the Brontë's juvenilia, notably in Branwell's The Life of Alexander Percy, which tells the story of an all-consuming, death-defying, and ultimately self-destructive love and is generally considered an inspiration for Wuthering Heights.

At seventeen, Emily began to attend the Roe Head Girls' School, where Charlotte was a teacher, but suffered from extreme homesickness and left after only a few months. Charlotte wrote later that "Liberty was the breath of Emily's nostrils; without it, she perished. The change from her own home to a school and from her own very noiseless, very secluded but unrestricted and unartificial mode of life, to one of disciplined routine (though under the kindest auspices), was what she failed in enduring... I felt in my heart she would die if she did not go home, and with this conviction obtained her recall." Emily returned home and Anne took her place. At this time, the girls' objective was to obtain sufficient education to open a small school of their own.

Adulthood

Emily became a teacher at Law Hill School in Halifax beginning in September 1838, when she was twenty. Her always fragile health soon broke under the stress of the 17-hour work day and she returned home in April 1839. Thereafter she remained at home, doing most of the cooking, ironing, and cleaning at Haworth. She taught herself German out of books and also practised the piano.

In 1842, Emily accompanied Charlotte to the Héger Pensionnat in Brussels, Belgium, where they attended the girls' academy run by Constantin Héger in the hope of perfecting their French and German before opening their school. Unlike Charlotte, Emily was uncomfortable in Brussels, and refused to adopt Belgian fashions, saying "I wish to be as God made me", which rendered her  something of an outcast. Nine of Emily's French essays survive from this period. Héger seems to have been impressed with the strength of Emily's character, writing that:
She should have been a man – a great navigator. Her powerful reason would have deduced new spheres of discovery from the knowledge of the old; and her strong imperious will would never have been daunted by opposition or difficulty, never have given way but with life. She had a head for logic, and a capability of argument unusual in a man and rarer indeed in a woman... impairing this gift was her stubborn tenacity of will which rendered her obtuse to all reasoning where her own wishes, or her own sense of right, was concerned.
The two sisters were committed to their studies and by the end of the term had become so competent in French that Madame Héger proposed that they both stay another half-year, even, according to Charlotte, offering to dismiss the English master so that she could take his place. Emily had, by this time, become a competent pianist and teacher and it was suggested that she might stay on to teach music. However, the illness and death of their aunt drove them to return to their father and Haworth. In 1844, the sisters attempted to open a school in their house, but their plans were stymied by an inability to attract students to the remote area.

In 1844, Emily began going through all the poems she had written, recopying them neatly into two notebooks. One was labelled "Gondal Poems"; the other was unlabelled. Scholars such as Fannie Ratchford and Derek Roper have attempted to piece together a Gondal storyline and chronology from these poems.
In the autumn of 1845, Charlotte discovered the notebooks and insisted that the poems be published. Emily, furious at the invasion of her privacy, at first refused but relented when Anne brought out her own manuscripts and revealed to Charlotte that she had been writing poems in secret as well. As co-authors of Gondal stories, Anne and Emily were accustomed to read their Gondal stories and poems to each other, while Charlotte was excluded from their privacy. Around this time Emily had written one of her most famous poems "No coward soul is mine", probably as an answer to the violation of her privacy and her own transformation into a published writer. Despite Charlotte's later claim, it was not her last poem.

In 1846, the sisters' poems were published in one volume as Poems by Currer, Ellis, and Acton Bell. The Brontë sisters had adopted pseudonyms for publication, preserving their initials: Charlotte was "Currer Bell", Emily was "Ellis Bell" and Anne was "Acton Bell". Charlotte wrote in the 'Biographical Notice of Ellis and Acton Bell' that their "ambiguous choice" was "dictated by a sort of conscientious scruple at assuming Christian names positively masculine, while we did not like to declare ourselves women, because... we had a vague impression that authoresses are liable to be looked on with prejudice". Charlotte contributed 19 poems, and Emily and Anne each contributed 21. Although the sisters were told several months after publication that only two copies had sold, they were not discouraged (of their two readers, one was impressed enough to request their autographs). The Athenaeum reviewer praised Ellis Bell's work for its music and power, singling out his poems as the best: "Ellis possesses a fine, quaint spirit and an evident power of wing that may reach heights not here attempted", and The Critic reviewer recognised "the presence of more genius than it was supposed this utilitarian age had devoted to the loftier exercises of the intellect."

Personality and character

Emily Brontë's solitary and reclusive nature has made her a mysterious figure and a challenge for biographers to assess. Except for Ellen Nussey and Louise de Bassompierre, Emily's fellow student in Brussels, she does not seem to have made any friends outside her family. Her closest friend was her sister Anne. Together they shared their own fantasy world, Gondal, and, according to Ellen Nussey, in childhood they were "like twins", "inseparable companions" and "in the very closest sympathy which never had any interruption". In 1845 Anne took Emily to visit some of the places she had come to know and love in the five years she spent as governess. A plan to visit Scarborough fell through and instead the sisters went to York where Anne showed Emily York Minster. During the trip the sisters acted out some of their Gondal characters.

Charlotte Brontë remains the primary source of information about Emily, although as an elder sister, writing publicly about her only shortly after her death, she is considered by certain scholars not to be a neutral witness. Stevie Davies believes that there is what might be called Charlotte's smoke-screen and argues that Emily evidently shocked her, to the point where she may even have doubted her sister's sanity. After Emily's death, Charlotte rewrote her character, history and even poems on a more acceptable (to her and the bourgeois reading public) model. Biographer Claire O'Callaghan suggests that the trajectory of Brontë's legacy was altered significantly by Elizabeth Gaskell’s biography of Charlotte, concerning not only because Gaskell did not visit Haworth until after Emily’s death, but also because Gaskell admits to disliking what she did know of Emily in her biography of Charlotte. As O'Callaghan and others have noted, Charlotte was Gaskell's primary source of information on Emily's life and may have exaggerated or fabricated Emily’s frailty and shyness to cast herself in the role of maternal saviour.

Charlotte presented Emily as someone whose "natural" love of the beauties of nature had become somewhat exaggerated owing to her shy nature, portraying her as too fond of the Yorkshire moors, and homesick whenever she was away. According to Lucasta Miller, in her analysis of Brontë biographies, "Charlotte took on the role of Emily's first mythographer." In the Preface to the Second Edition of Wuthering Heights, in 1850, Charlotte wrote:
My sister's disposition was not naturally gregarious; circumstances favoured and fostered her tendency to seclusion; except to go to church or take a walk on the hills, she rarely crossed the threshold of home. Though her feeling for the people round was benevolent, intercourse with them she never sought; nor, with very few exceptions, ever experienced. And yet she knew them: knew their ways, their language, their family histories; she could hear of them with interest, and talk of them with detail, minute, graphic, and accurate; but WITH them, she rarely exchanged a word.

Emily's unsociability and extremely shy nature have subsequently been reported many times. According to Norma Crandall, her "warm, human aspect" was "usually revealed only in her love of nature and of animals". In a similar description, Literary news (1883) states: "[Emily] loved the solemn moors, she loved all wild, free creatures and things", and critics attest that her love of the moors is manifest in Wuthering Heights. Over the years, Emily's love of nature has been the subject of many anecdotes. A newspaper dated 31 December 1899, gives the folksy account that "with bird and beast [Emily] had the most intimate relations, and from her walks she often came with fledgling or young rabbit in hand, talking softly to it, quite sure, too, that it understood". Elizabeth Gaskell, in her biography of Charlotte, told the story of Emily's punishing her pet dog Keeper for lying "on the delicate white counterpane" that covered one of the beds in the Parsonage. According to Gaskell, she struck him with her fists until he was "half-blind" with his eyes "swelled up". This story is apocryphal, and contradicts the following account of Emily's and Keeper's relationship:
Poor old Keeper, Emily's faithful friend and worshipper, seemed to understand her like a human being. One evening, when the four friends were sitting closely round the fire in the sitting-room, Keeper forced himself in between Charlotte and Emily and mounted himself on Emily’s lap; finding the space too limited for his comfort he pressed himself forward on to the guest’s knees, making himself quite comfortable. Emily’s heart was won by the unresisting endurance of the visitor, little guessing that she herself, being in close contact, was the inspiring cause of submission to Keeper’s preference. Sometimes Emily would delight in showing off Keeper—make him frantic in action, and roar with the voice of a lion. It was a terrifying exhibition within the walls of an ordinary sitting-room. Keeper was a solemn mourner at Emily’s funeral and never recovered his cheerfulness. 
In Queens of Literature of the Victorian Era (1886), Eva Hope summarises Emily's character as "a peculiar mixture of timidity and Spartan-like courage", and goes on to say, "She was painfully shy, but physically she was brave to a surprising degree. She loved few persons, but those few with a passion of self-sacrificing tenderness and devotion. To other people's failings she was understanding and forgiving, but over herself she kept a continual and most austere watch, never allowing herself to deviate for one instant from what she considered her duty."

Emily Brontë has often been characterised as a devout if somewhat unorthodox Christian, a heretic and a visionary "mystic of the moors".

Wuthering Heights

Emily Brontë's Wuthering Heights was first published in London in 1847 by Thomas Cautley Newby, appearing as the first two volumes of a three-volume set that included Anne Brontë's Agnes Grey. The authors were printed as being Ellis and Acton Bell; Emily's real name did not appear until 1850, when it was printed on the title page of an edited commercial edition. The novel's innovative structure somewhat puzzled critics.

Wuthering Heightss violence and passion led the Victorian public and many early reviewers to think that it had been written by a man. According to Juliet Gardiner, "the vivid sexual passion and power of its language and imagery impressed, bewildered and appalled reviewers." Literary critic Thomas Joudrey further contextualizes this reaction: "Expecting in the wake of Charlotte Brontë's Jane Eyre to be swept up in an earnest Bildungsroman, they were instead shocked and confounded by a tale of unchecked primal passions, replete with savage cruelty and outright barbarism." Even though the novel received mixed reviews when it first came out, and was often condemned for its portrayal of amoral passion, the book subsequently became an English literary classic. Emily Brontë never knew the extent of fame she achieved with her only novel, as she died a year after its publication, aged 30.

Although a letter from her publisher indicates that Emily had begun to write a second novel, the manuscript has never been found. Perhaps Emily or a member of her family eventually destroyed the manuscript, if it existed, when she was prevented by illness from completing it. It has also been suggested that, though less likely, the letter could have been intended for Anne Brontë, who was already writing The Tenant of Wildfell Hall, her second novel.

Death
Emily's health was probably weakened by the harsh local climate and by unsanitary conditions at home,  where water was contaminated by run off from the church's graveyard. Branwell died suddenly, on Sunday, 24 September 1848. At his funeral service, a week later, Emily caught a severe cold that quickly developed into inflammation of the lungs and led to tuberculosis. Though her condition worsened steadily, she rejected medical help and all offered remedies, saying that she would have "no poisoning doctor" near her. On the morning of 19 December 1848, Charlotte, fearing for her sister, wrote:
She grows daily weaker. The physician's opinion was expressed too obscurely to be of use – he sent some medicine which she would not take. Moments so dark as these I have never known – I pray for God's support to us all.
At noon, Emily was worse; she could only whisper in gasps. With her last audible words she said to Charlotte, "If you will send for a doctor, I will see him now", but it was too late. She died that same day at about two in the afternoon. According to Mary Robinson, an early biographer of Emily, it happened while she was sitting on the sofa. However, Charlotte's letter to William Smith Williams where she mentions Emily's dog, Keeper, lying at the side of her dying-bed, makes this statement seem unlikely.

It was less than three months after Branwell's death, which led Martha Brown, a housemaid, to declare that "Miss Emily died of a broken heart for love of her brother". Emily had grown so thin that her coffin measured only 16 inches (40 centimeters) wide. The carpenter said he had never made a narrower one for an adult. Her mortal remains were interred in the family vault in St Michael and All Angels' Church, Haworth.

Legacy
The English folk group The Unthanks released Lines, a trilogy of short albums, which includes settings of Brontë's poems to music and was recorded at the Brontës' parsonage home, using their own Regency era piano, played by Adrian McNally.

In the 2019 film How to Build a Girl, Emily and Charlotte Brontë are among the historical figures in Johanna's wall collage.

In May 2021, the contents of the Honresfield library, a collection of rare books and manuscripts first assembled by Rochdale mill owners Alfred and William Law, re-emerged after being out of public view for nearly a century. In the collection were handwritten poems by Emily Brontë, as well as the Brontë family edition of Bewick's 'History of British Birds.' The collection was to be auctioned off at Sotheby's and was estimated to sell for £1 million.

The 1946 film Devotion was  a highly fictionalized account of the lives of the Brontë sisters.

In the 2022 film Emily, written and directed by Frances O'Connor, Emma Mackey plays Emily before the publication of Wuthering Heights. The film mixes known biographical details with imagined situations and relationships.

Works

Electronic editions

See also

 Walterclough Hall – a residence north-east of the village of Southowram
 "To a Wreath of Snow" – a poem by Emily published in 1837
 "Come hither child" – a poem by Emily published in 1839
 "A Death-Scene" – a poem by Emily published in 1846
 Emily (2022 film)

References

Notes

Citations

Sources

Further reading

 Emily Brontë, Charles Simpson
 In the Footsteps of the Brontës, Ellis Chadwick
 Last Things: Emily Brontë's Poems, Janet Gezari
 The Oxford Reader's Companion to the Brontës, Christine Alexander & Margaret Smith
 The Brontë Myth, Lucasta Miller
 Emily, Daniel Wynne
 Emily Brontë, Winifred Gerin
 A Chainless Soul: A Life of Emily Brontë, Katherine Frank
 Emily Brontë. Her Life and Work, Muriel Spark and Derek Stanford
 
 L. P. Hartley, 'Emily Brontë In Gondal And Galdine', in L. P. Hartley, The Novelist's Responsibility (1967), p. 35–53
 Emily's Ghost: A Novel of the Brontë Sisters, Denise Giardina
 Charlotte and Emily: A Novel of the Brontës, Jude Morgan
 Dark Quartet, Lynne Reid Banks
 Literature and Evil, Georges Bataille

External links

 Emily Brontë papers, 1830s-1990s, held by the Berg Collection, New York Public Library
 The Brontë Society and Brontë Parsonage Museum in Haworth
 Locations associated with Wuthering Heights and Emily Brontë — Google Maps
Emily Brontë at the British Library
 Poems by Emily Jane Brontë at English-Poetry.RU

1818 births
1848 deaths
19th-century English novelists
19th-century English women writers
19th-century English writers
19th-century deaths from tuberculosis
19th-century pseudonymous writers
Anglican writers
Emily
Burials in West Yorkshire
English Anglicans
English fantasy writers
English governesses
English people of Cornish descent
English people of Irish descent
English women novelists
English women poets
Tuberculosis deaths in England
People from Thornton and Allerton
Pseudonymous women writers
Victorian novelists
Victorian women writers
Writers of Gothic fiction